In enzymology, a 3alpha(or 20beta)-hydroxysteroid dehydrogenase is an enzyme that catalyzes the chemical reaction

androstan-3alpha,17beta-diol + NAD+  17beta-hydroxyandrostan-3-one + NADH + H+

Thus, the two substrates of this enzyme are androstan-3alpha,17beta-diol and NAD+, whereas its 3 products are 17beta-hydroxyandrostan-3-one, NADH, and H+.

This enzyme belongs to the family of oxidoreductases, specifically those acting on the CH-OH group of donor with NAD+ or NADP+ as acceptor. The systematic name of this enzyme class is 3alpha(or 20beta)-hydroxysteroid:NAD+ oxidoreductase. Other names in common use include cortisone reductase, (R)-20-hydroxysteroid dehydrogenase, dehydrogenase, 20beta-hydroxy steroid, Delta4-3-ketosteroid hydrogenase, 20beta-hydroxysteroid dehydrogenase, 3alpha,20beta-hydroxysteroid:NAD+-oxidoreductase, NADH-20beta-hydroxysteroid dehydrogenase, and 20beta-HSD. This enzyme participates in bile acid biosynthesis and c21-steroid hormone metabolism.

Structural studies

References

 
 
 
 
 

EC 1.1.1
NADH-dependent enzymes
Enzymes of known structure